The Carolinas Junior College Conference (CJCC) is a component of the National Junior College Athletic Association (NJCAA), in which it is also known as Region 10.  Teams represent various junior colleges, technical colleges, and community colleges. Conference championships are held in most sports and individuals can be named to All-Conference and All-Academic teams.

Member schools

Current members
The CJCAC currently has 35 full members, all but three are public schools:

Notes

See also
National Junior College Athletic Association (NJCAA)

External links
Region 10 website
NJCAA Website

 
NJCAA conferences